Nalini Ravishanker is an Indian statistician interested in time series analysis and in applications of statistics to actuarial science, business, and transportation. She is a professor of statistics at the University of Connecticut, co-editor-in-chief of International Statistical Review, and president of the International Society for Business and Industrial Statistics for 2015–2017.

Ravishanker earned a bachelor's degree in statistics in 1981 from Presidency College, Chennai. She completed her PhD in 1987 from the New York University Stern School of Business. After a temporary position at the IBM Thomas J. Watson Research Center she joined the Connecticut faculty in 1989.

With Dipak K. Dey, Ravishanker is the author of A First Course in Linear Model Theory (Chapman & Hall, 2001; 2nd ed., 2017). She is also one of the editors of Handbook of Discrete-Valued Time Series (Chapman & Hall, 2015).

Ravishanker is a fellow of the American Statistical Association and an elected member of the International Statistical Institute. She was named to the 2021 class of Fellows of the American Association for the Advancement of Science.

References

External links
Home page

Year of birth missing (living people)
Living people
American statisticians
Indian statisticians
Women statisticians
Presidency College, Chennai alumni
New York University alumni
University of Connecticut faculty
Elected Members of the International Statistical Institute
Fellows of the American Statistical Association
Fellows of the American Association for the Advancement of Science